Page Four – A Collection of Her Most Famous Songs is a Patti Page LP album, issued by Mercury Records as catalog number MG-20101 in 1957.

This was the final album in a series of four, titled "Page 1" to "Page 4".

Billboard welcomed the album saying: 'The fourth LP in Patti Page’s “Page” series should be another steady seller for the thrush and, as always, a big favorite with deejays. The photogenic lark gives the cover considerable display value, while her creamy vocal talents are heard to fine advantage on such nostalgic standards as “Happiness Is a Thing Called Joe,” “There Will Never Be Another You” and her old hit single “I Went to Your Wedding.”'

Track listing

References

Patti Page albums
Mercury Records compilation albums
1957 compilation albums